Punjabi wedding traditions are a strong reflection of Punjabi culture with ritual, song, dance, food, and dress that have evolved over centuries.

Pre-wedding traditions

Rokka (pre-engagement)
Roka is one of the most significant ceremonies that take place before a Punjabi wedding. The roka ceremony marks the union of both the bride and groom's family and friends. Gifts from both families are acceptable at Rokka.

Kurmai (engagement)
Engagement is a significant part of a Punjabi wedding. First, the girl is draped with a fulkari (very decorative dupatta), which is usually very ornate. In some families this chunni is a family heirloom, passed down from generation to generation. She is also presented with jewellery, which her mother and sister-in-law help her wear. A tiny dot of henna paste (mehndi) is applied to her palm for good luck, and the function is sealed with the exchange of rings. The bride's father applies the tikka (forehead mark) to the groom's forehead and blesses him. Exchange of gifts takes place between the two families. Everyone present congratulates the couple by feeding them sweets.

Dholki/sangeet
There is a sangeet function hosted by the bride's family, in which just a few close members of the groom's family are invited. The bride's family play the dholak drums and sing songs in which they tease the groom and his family. Nowadays, people hire DJs and have a dance party, followed by dinner. A ladies sangeet/ cocktail is held for the bride and her bridesmaids.

Mehndi
The last major function before the wedding is decoration with temporary henna (mehndi) tattoos. This is often blended with the sangeet ceremony. Mehndi artists are called to the houses of the boy and girl and apply mehendi to the palms of the female family members, groom and the hands and feet of the bride. A basket containing Bindi and bangles is handed around so girls can choose those that match the outfit they plan to wear to the wedding. The Mehendi ceremony takes place in the atmosphere of a party. The bride and other ladies get mehendi (henna designs) done, on their hands and feet (most ladies get it done only on their hands but the bride gets it done on both hands and feet). For the bride the mehendi is sent by the future Mother in Law, which is beautifully decorated.

Common rituals

Rituals at the bride’s home

Choora: On the wedding day the rituals at the girl's home begin with the Choora ceremony. The oldest maternal uncle and aunt play an important role in the performance of the ceremony. Choora is basically a set of Red bangles, gifted by girl's mama (mother's brother).  People touch the choora and give their heartiest wishes to the girl for her future married life. Also, they sprinkle flower petals on the bride. After that, the girl's uncle, aunt, friends and cousins tie kaliras (silver, gold or gold plated traditional ornaments) to a bangle worn by the girl.

Mayian: This is the preparation ceremony one day before a Punjabi wedding. This ceremony is an evening festival, at the couple's parental homes. It consists of many rites, the Batna, Choora, Jaggo fireworks and sometimes the Ladies Sangeet and Mehndi. The mayian happens the night before the wedding and is celebrated according to which part of Punjab the participants are from. 

Vatna/Haldi: Four lamps or diyas are lit and the bride sits facing them. Oil is constantly poured into the lamps, so that the glow from the diyas is reflected on her face. Vatna involves applying a paste made from turmeric powder and mustard oil all over the bride's body by her female friends and relatives. This is done to make the bride look more beautiful on the most special day of her life. This ritual demands that the bride stay at home in her old clothes for a couple of days before her wedding. Ubtan is supposed to bring a glow to the bride's and groom's body, especially on their faces. This tradition is also known as Shaint in some cultures. After this ritual, the bride and groom are constrained from meeting each other until the wedding ceremony.

Ghara gharoli: A decorated pitcher of water (ghadoli) is brought for the bride's bath by the bride's bhabi (brother's wife). In the ghara gharoli ritual, the bride's sibling or sibling's spouse visits the nearby temple and fills a pitcher with holy water. The girl is then bathed with this holy water. Thereafter, the bride wears her wedding attire. The ghara gharoli and the vatna ceremonies take place at the groom's house too. But over there, the groom's sister-in-law brings the pitcher of water. As per the tradition, their wedding dress is presented to them by their respective maternal uncles.

Jaggo: In this ceremony, the family dances and sings in the beautifully decorated wedding home. Jaggo is celebrated in the last hours of the night. They decorate copper or brass vessel called khadaa with diveh (clay lamps) and fill them with mustard oil and light them. The bride or bridegroom's maternal aunt (mami) carries it on her head, and another woman will carry a long stick with bells, shaking it. The women will then go into other friends' and families' homes; after being welcomed by sweets and drinks, they dance there and move on. It is a loud ceremony, filled with joy, dancing, fireworks, and food. It is also practised in Pakistan.

Rituals at the grooms’s home

Sarvala: A young nephew or cousin dons the same attire as the groom. He is called the sarvala (caretaker of the groom) and accompanies him.

Sehra: Like the bride's home, the Vatna and Ghara Gharoli are followed by the dressing up of the groom in his wedding attire. After the groom has dressed up in his wedding clothes, a puja is performed. Thereafter, the groom's sister ties the sehra on the groom's head. After the completion of Sehrabandi ceremony, all those who witness the function give gifts and cash to the boy as a token of good luck.

Varna is a ceremony that is supposed to ward off the evil eye. The groom's bhabi lines his eyes with surma (kohl).

Ghodi Chadna is the final ceremony at the groom's place. The groom's sisters and cousins feed and adorn his mare. To ward off the evil eye, people use cash and perform the Varna ritual. The cash is then distributed among the poor. After this the boy climbs the horse and leaves his home for the wedding venue.

Rituals at the marriage venue

Milni literally means "introductions". In a Sikh marriage, Ardas is performed by the person in charge of looking after the Sikh scriptures, followed by the formal introductions of senior men in the families. For example, both eldest chachas (father's younger brother) will come together and exchange garlands of flowers.  In the Milni ceremony, the girl's relatives give shagun (a token of good luck) to the groom's close relatives in descending order of age. Cash and clothes are gifted.

Jaimala/Varmala: After Milni, the bride and groom come in the center of the circle where the family is standing, and place a heavily made garland made of flowers- varmala on each other to state, they accept each other and will love and live together with one another. Friends and relatives of the bride and groom indulge in teasing and fun, to celebrate this happy occasion. An auspicious time or muhurat is chosen for the performance of wedding ceremony. 

Kanyadaan and Phere: The bride's father puts a ring on the boy's finger and then he gives his daughter to the boy. This ritual is known as the Kanyadaan. It is after the kanyadaan that the pheras begin. The pheras take place in front of the sacred fire, agni. After this the groom applies Sindoor (vermilion) to the girl's hair partition and the Mangalsutra Rasam takes place where the groom ties a beaded necklace i.e. a mangalsutra to the girl's neck. When all these rituals are over, the couple gets up to touch the feet of all the elder members in the family and seek their blessings for a happily married life. In a Hindu Punjabi Wedding, Agni (sacred fire) is usually encircled four times.

In a Sikh wedding, the bride and groom will walk in tow around the Guru Granth Sahib four times, called laavaan. This signifies they not only vow to see each other as one soul in two bodies, the ideal in Sikh marriage, but also as the Guru as the center of their marriage. Sikhs do not do pujas during any part of the marriage ceremony.

Joota chupai literally means 'hiding the shoes'. The bride's sisters indulge in stealing of shoes. It is a fun tradition, in which the girls charge a fee for agreeing to return the shoes. They demand Kalecharis of gold for the bride's sisters and of silver for her cousins.

Post-wedding rituals

Vidaai/Doli: Vidaai marks the departure of the bride from her parental house. As a custom, the bride throws phulian or puffed rice over her head. The ritual conveys her good wishes for her parents. A traditionally sad ritual, here the bride says goodbye to her parents, siblings and rest of her family. Her brothers/male cousins then lead her to her husband, who waits to take her to his family home to begin her new life as a married woman. Her relatives throw coins in the wake of this procession. In keeping with tradition the mother in-law will often not come to the Doli and instead make preparations at home to greet the arrival of her son and new wife.

The mother-in-law has a glass of water in her hand, which she circles 3 times around her bahu and then offers it to her to drink, as a symbol of her acceptance and blessing as her newest daughter.

Rituals observed at the groom's house

Reception at the boy's house: The newlyweds are welcomed in a ceremony called the pani bharna. Then the bride must, with her right foot, kick the sarson ka tel (mustard oil) that is put on the sides of the entrance door before she enters the house. Then, along with her husband, she must offer puja in their room. Then they must touch the feet of the elders in a ceremony called matha tekna. The rest of the evening is spent playing traditional games.

Phera Dalna: The newly weds visit the bride's parents on the day after the wedding. The bride's brother usually fetches them.

Important wedding songs

Songs of the bridegroom's side

 Mangane di geet: sung at the time of engagement
 Maneve de gaon: songs sung to welcome the bridegroom
 Gharouli de geet: sung while filling the pitcher (gharouli) for Bride/Bridegroom's bath before the wedding
 Chounki charanvele de geet: songs sung when the bridegroom sits on the chounki wooden bathing seat
 Suhag: sung by the bride in praise of her parents and the happy days of her childhood and in anticipation of happy days ahead
 Jaggo: procession song to call the neighbours to the wedding
 Churra charan vele da geet: sung when the chura ceremonial bangles are worn by the bride
 Janj: sung when the janj marriage procession is to be greeted
 Milni: sung at the ritual introduction of the two sides
 Ghenne de geet: sung when the bride is adorned with jewels
 Siftan: song in praise of the bridegroom
 Chhandh: evolved from poetry, songs of joy

Sitthniyan (taunts)

 Song sung when the bridegroom's procession is being welcomed
 Song sung when the wari, or gifts from the bridegroom's side, are being exhibited
 Song sung when the groom's party sits down to the meal
 Song sung when the daaj, dowry or the bridal gifts, are being displayed

Others

 Lavan Phere: sung at the time of the actual wedding ritual
 Maiya: sung when the girl is preparing for the wedding and is bathed by the women at home. It goes for both men and women.
 Vedi de geet: sung while erecting the marriage pandal
 Khatt: sung at the time the maternal grandparents present gifts to the bride on an overturned tokra, or basket
 Pani vaarna: welcoming the bride to her new home
 Bidaigi: sung when the bride is being sent off in the doli
 Ghughrian: sung when the doli arrives at the groom's house
 Shahana: sung by mirasis in praise of the bridegroom
 Til Methre: sung while welcoming the bride and orienting her to the family
 Pattal: song sung before meal

See also
 Arranged marriage in India
 Sikh wedding
 Punjabi culture
 Indian wedding photography
 Hindi wedding songs

Punjabi culture
Indian wedding traditions
Weddings by culture
Marriage in Pakistan
Pakistani traditions